Tramvia Metropolità, SA (TramMet) is a company based in Barcelona, Catalonia, Spain. It's a joint venture of the companies ¡FCC-Vivendi, COMSA, Acciona-Necso, Alstom, Sarbus, Soler&Sauret, Banc Sabadell and Société Générale.  It was created in 1999 to operate the new tram systems in Barcelona, Trambaix and Trambesòs from April 27, 2000. The Trambaix network was inaugurated on April 3, 2004, whereas the inauguration of Trambesòs took a bit longer, May 8 of that year.

Rolling stock
Alstom Citadis 302

See also
Autoritat del Transport Metropolità
Trambaix, Trambesòs

References

External links
Tram

Trams in Barcelona
Companies based in Barcelona
Transport operators in Barcelona
Railway companies of Spain
1999 establishments in Catalonia
Rail transport in Barcelona